

Gustav Kieseritzky (22 September 1893 – 19 November 1943) was a German admiral during World War II. He was a recipient of the Knight's Cross of the Iron Cross of Nazi Germany. Kieseritzky was killed on 19 November 1943 during the Kerch–Eltigen Operation. He was posthumously awarded the Knight's Cross on 20 November 1943.

Awards 

 Knight's Cross of the Iron Cross on 17 September 1944 as Vizeadmiral and commanding Admiral of Schwarzes Meer

Notes

References

 

1893 births
1943 deaths
People from Rendsburg
People from the Province of Schleswig-Holstein
Imperial German Navy personnel of World War I
Reichsmarine personnel
Vice admirals of the Kriegsmarine
Recipients of the clasp to the Iron Cross, 1st class
Recipients of the Hanseatic Cross (Lübeck)
Recipients of the Gold German Cross
Recipients of the Knight's Cross of the Iron Cross
Kriegsmarine personnel killed in World War II
Military personnel from Schleswig-Holstein